The flags of the subdivisions of Ukraine exhibit a wide variety of regional influences and local histories, reflecting different styles and design principles. Most local flags were designed and adopted after Ukrainian independence in 1991.

Flags of Ukrainian oblasts

Flag of autonomous republic

Flags of cities with special status

Historical

Flags of Ukrainian oblasts

Flags of Ruthenian lands in the battle of Tannenberg, 1410

Cossacks' flags captured by Radzivil in 1651

Flags of Black Sea Cossack Host

See also 
Coats of arms of the regions of Ukraine
List of flags of the raions of Ukraine
Flags of populated places of Ukraine
Flag of Ukraine
List of Ukrainian flags

regions
Ukraine
Flags
National symbols of Ukraine
Ukraine
Flags